Almalu (also Romanized as Ālmālū) is a village in Zeri Rural District, Qatur District, Khoy County, West Azerbaijan Province, Iran. At the 2006 census, its population was 913, in 203 families.

References 

Populated places in Khoy County